Bad Gams is a former municipality and, traditionally, a market town, in the district of Deutschlandsberg in Styria, Austria, roughly 30 km from Graz. Since the 2015 Styria municipal structural reform, it is part of the municipality Deutschlandsberg, together with Deutschlandsberg, Freiland bei Deutschlandsberg, Kloster, Osterwitz and Trahütten.

Population

References

Cities and towns in Deutschlandsberg District